Claúdio Chicola (born 25 September 1999) is an Angolan handball player for G.D. Interclube and the Angolan national team.

He represented Angola at the 2019 World Men's Handball Championship.

References

1999 births
Living people
Angolan male handball players
Competitors at the 2019 African Games
African Games competitors for Angola
African Games medalists in handball
African Games gold medalists for Angola